Upstream Downtown is an outdoor 1992 sculpture by American artist Gary Hirsch, installed along the exterior side of the parking garage at Southwest 3rd Avenue and Southwest Morrison Street in Portland, Oregon. The installation features a series of eighteen multi-colored fish sculptures made of aluminum, acrylic and enamel, each measuring  x . According to the Regional Arts & Culture Council, which administers the work, Hirsch said: "I intended the piece to serve as a whimsical analogy to downtown business life. It's frenetic, humorous story with each of us bustling against the stream to get what we want." It is part of the City of Portland and Multnomah County Public Art Collection courtesy of the Regional Arts & Culture Council.

See also
 1992 in art

References

External links
 Gary Hirsch: For The Love of Bots! by J.W. Boys, Emerging Artist Magazine
 Upstream Downtown at the Public Art Archive
 A Guide to Portland Public Art (PDF), Regional Arts & Culture Council

1992 establishments in Oregon
1992 sculptures
Aluminum sculptures in Oregon
Animal sculptures in Oregon
Fish in art
Outdoor sculptures in Portland, Oregon
Southwest Portland, Oregon